Kostas Koutsomytis (20 September 1938 – 10 March 2016) was a Greek film director and screenwriter who worked mostly in television.

Biography

Koutsomytis was born in Grevena.

He directed his first movie in 1965, a short film named To Domatio. In television he debuted in 1971, directing the series Agnostos Polemos that was aired in Greek State Television. He directed some of the most successful series in the Greek television such as Vammena Kokkina Mallia, Prova Nyfikou, I Agapi Argise mia Mera etc. He won one cinema award for the film Kloios (best screenplay) and three Greek television awards for the series I Agapi Argise mia Mera, Ta Paidia tis Niovis and Matomena Homata. His series are usually based in the novels of famous Greek writers such as Dido Sotiriou, Lili Zografou, Dora Giannakopoulou, Giannis Xanthoulis and others.

Koutsomytis died on 10 March 2016 in Sismanoglio in Athens.

Filmography

Cinema

Television

References

External links

Greek film directors
Greek screenwriters
1938 births
2016 deaths
People from Grevena